Torbjörn Jonsson (6 May 1936 – 16 October 2018) was a Swedish professional footballer who played as a midfielder.

Career
Jonsson played for five seasons (134 games, 27 goals) in the Italian Serie A for ACF Fiorentina, A.S. Roma and A.C. Mantova.

Honours
Individual
 Guldbollen: 1960

References

1936 births
2018 deaths
People from Söderhamn Municipality
Sportspeople from Gävleborg County
Swedish footballers
Association football midfielders
Sweden international footballers
Allsvenskan players
Serie A players
Serie B players
IFK Norrköping players
ACF Fiorentina players
A.S. Roma players
Mantova 1911 players
Swedish expatriate footballers
Swedish expatriate sportspeople in Italy
Expatriate footballers in Italy